Nicolette Andrea "Nicki" Hernández Sippel (born February 17, 1999) is a professional footballer who plays as a midfielder for Liga MX Femenil side Club América. Born in the United States, she represents the Mexico women's national team.

College career 
Hernández played college soccer for the Michigan Wolverines from 2017 to 2021, making 93 appearances and scoring 29 goals with the Wolverines.

Club career 
Hernández signed her first professional contract with Club América of the Liga MX Femenil on December 31, 2021, and made her debut with América on January 15, 2022, in a match against Pumas. Hernández scored her first goal as a professional on February 10, 2022, on a match against Club León.

International career 
Hernández was called to the Mexico women's national football team for the first time on November 18, 2021, for friendly matches against Canada, but was unable to attend. Hernández was called once more to the Mexico national team by manager Pedro López on October 3, 2022, to replace Joseline Montoya (Injury) for a friendly match against Chile. Hernández made her debut with Mexico on October 10, 2022, on the friendly match against Chile.

Career statistics

Club

References

External links 
 
 
 

1999 births
Living people
Mexican women's footballers
Club América (women) footballers
Liga MX Femenil players
Mexico women's international footballers
Women's association football midfielders
Expatriate footballers in Mexico